Patrick Joseph Noel Purcell (23 December 1900 – 3 March 1985) was a distinguished Irish actor of stage, screen, and television. He appeared in the 1956 film Moby Dick and the 1962 film Mutiny on the Bounty.

Early life and education
Patrick Joseph Noel Purcell was the son of Dublin auctioneer Pierce Purcell and his second wife Catherine (née Hoban), an antique dealer. He was born at 11a, Lower Mercer Street, one of two houses owned by his mother's family.

Purcell was educated at Synge Street CBS. He lost the tip of his right index finger while making cigarette vending machines, and was also missing his entire left index finger due to a different accident while he was an apprentice carpenter, a feature which he exploited for dramatic effect in the film Mutiny on the Bounty (1962).

Career

Purcell began his show business career at the age of 12 in Dublin's Gaiety Theatre. Later, he toured Ireland in a vaudeville act with Jimmy O'Dea.

Stage-trained in the classics in Dublin, Purcell moved into films in 1934. He appeared in Captain Boycott (1947) and as the elderly sailor whose death marooned the lovers-to-be in the first sound film version of The Blue Lagoon (1949). He played a member of Captain Ahab's crew in Moby Dick (1956), Dan O'Flaherty in episode one, The Majesty of the Law, of The Rising of the Moon (1957), a gamekeeper in The List of Adrian Messenger (1963), and a barman in The Mackintosh Man (1973); the last two films were directed by John Huston.

In 1955, he was an off-and-on regular on the British filmed TV series The Buccaneers (released to American TV in 1956). He narrated a Hibernian documentary, Seven Wonders of Ireland (1959). In 1962, he portrayed the lusty William McCoy in Lewis Milestone's Mutiny on the Bounty. He played a taciturn Irish in-law to Lebanese American entertainer Danny Thomas's character Danny Williams in a 1963 episode of The Danny Thomas Show. In 1971, he played the caring rabbi in the children's musical drama Flight of the Doves.

He was the subject of This Is Your Life in 1958 when he was surprised by Eamonn Andrews at the BBC Television Theatre.

Purcell also gained some recognition as a singer. Shortly after the Second World War, songwriter Leo Maguire composed "The Dublin Saunter" for him. He performed the song live for many years and later recorded it for the Glenside label. However, the recording was not a hit. As Purcell recalled many years later, "I don't think one person in the world bought it." However, over time it became one of the most favourite songs about Dublin, receiving countless air-play on radio programmes. In his latter years, Purcell was asked by RTÉ journalist Colm Connolly whether he had received many royalties down the years. Purcell replied: "Not a penny. I recorded it as a favour for a pal, Leo Maguire, who'd written it. No contract or anything, so I never got a fee or any payments."

In 1981 (on YouTube it's 1974) he recorded a spoken word version of Pete St. John's "Dublin in the Rare Old Times".

In June 1984, Purcell was given the Freedom of the City of Dublin. Nine months later, he died in his native city at the age of 84.

Personal life
On 7 July 1941, Purcell married former child actress Eileen Marmion. They had four sons.

Selected filmography

Jimmy Boy (1935) 
Knight Without Armour (1937) as First Train Driver Trying to Clear Track (uncredited)
Odd Man Out (1947) as Tram Conductor (uncredited)
Captain Boycott (1947) as Daniel McGinty
The Blue Lagoon (1949) as Paddy Button
Saints and Sinners (1949) as Flaherty
Talk of a Million (1951) as Matty McGrath
No Resting Place (1951) as Garda Mannigan
Appointment with Venus (1951) as Trawler Langley
Encore (1951) as Tom, Captain (Segment "Winter Cruise")
Father's Doing Fine (1952) as Shaughneesy
The Crimson Pirate (1952) as Pablo Murphy
The Pickwick Papers (1952) as Roker
Decameron Nights (1953) as Father Francisco
Grand National Night (1953) as Philip Balfour
Doctor in the House (1954) as The Padre (uncredited)
The Seekers (1954) as Paddy Clarke
Mad About Men (1954) as Percy
Svengali (1954) as Patrick O'Ferrall
Douglas Fairbanks, Jr., Presents (1955) as Willie Hosmer
Doctor at Sea (1955) as Corbie
Jacqueline (1956) as Mr. Owen
Moby Dick (1956) as Ship's Carpenter
Lust for Life (1956) as Anton Mauve
The Buccaneers (1 episode, 1956) as Pat
The Adventures of Sir Lancelot (1 episode, 1956) as Liam
Doctor at Large (1957) as The Padre – Bartender
The Rising of the Moon (1957) as Dan O'Flaherty (1st Episode)
Merry Andrew (1958) as Matthew Larabee
Rooney (1958) as Tim Hennesy
The Key (1958) as Hotel Porter
Rockets Galore! (1958) as Father James
Shake Hands with the Devil (1959) as Liam O'Sullivan
Ferry to Hong Kong (1959) as Joe Skinner, Chief Engineer
Tommy the Toreador (1959) as Captain
Make Mine Mink (1960) as Burglar
Watch Your Stern (1960) as Adm. Sir Humphrey Pettigrew
The Millionairess (1960) as Prof. Merton
Man in the Moon (1960) as Prospector 
The Three Worlds of Gulliver (1960) as Capt. Pritchard (uncredited)
No Kidding (1961) as Tandy
Double Bunk (1961) as O'Malley 
Johnny Nobody (1961) as Brother Timothy
Three Spare Wives (1962) as Sir Hubert
The Iron Maiden (1962) as Admiral Sir Digby Trevelyan
Mutiny on the Bounty (1962) as Seaman William McCoy
Make Room for Daddy (1962) as Francis Daly
Nurse on Wheels (1963) as Abel Worthy
The Running Man (1963) as Miles Bleeker
The List of Adrian Messenger (1963) as Countryman (uncredited)
The DuPont Show of the Week (1 episode, 1963) as Meager
The Ceremony (1963) as Finigan
Lord Jim (1965) a Captain Chester
The Avengers (1 episode, 1965) as Jonah Barnard
Doctor in Clover (1966) as O'Malley
The Saint (2 episodes, 1964–1966) as Brendan Cullin / Mike Kelly
Drop Dead Darling (1966) as Capt. Daniel O'Flannery
Dr. Finlay's Casebook (1 episode, 1967) as Alexander Craig
The Violent Enemy (1967) as John Michael Leary
I Spy (1 episode, 1967) as Fletcher
Sinful Davey (1969) as Jock
Where's Jack? (1969) as Leatherchest
Dixon of Dock Green (1 episode, 1969) as Thomas
The McKenzie Break (1970) as Ferry Captain (uncredited)
Flight of the Doves (1971) as Rabbi
The Onedin Line (1 episode, 1972) as Hennessy
The Mackintosh Man (1973) as O'Donovan
The Irish R.M. (1 episode, 1984) as O'Reilly (final appearance)

See also

 List of people on stamps of Ireland

References

External links
 
 

1900 births
1985 deaths
Irish male film actors
Irish male television actors
Burials at Deans Grange Cemetery
Male actors from County Dublin
20th-century Irish male actors
People educated at Synge Street CBS